Fyling Hall railway station was a railway station on the Scarborough & Whitby Railway. It opened on 16 July 1885, and was named after Fyling Hall, near Fylingthorpe. It was a small rural station with one platform, serving a catchment of less than 200 people.

History
The station had the one platform located on the western edge of the line, with the toilets, goods store, waiting room, booking office and signal cabin all located on the platform itself. A single-road goods yard was located behind the platform capable of handling livestock and general goods, although there was no permanent crane. The station was often mis-spelt as Flying Hall in tourist literature.

In 1911, the North Eastern Railway assessed the station as having a catchment of 200 people, with 5,700 tickets issued in the same surveyed year. It closed temporarily on 1 December 1915 as a wartime economy measure, before reopening on 18 September 1920. In 1934 it became a block post to allow two trains on the line between Ravenscar and Robins Hood Bay travelling at the same time in the same direction. In the same year, the construction of a passing loop was proposed as Fyling Hall was one of four stations on the line which did not possess one, but the proposal was rejected because the traffic levels that would justify it only occurred over short time periods. It became an unstaffed halt from 5 May 1958 with a siding remaining in use for public deliveries.

Freight services were discontinued on 4 May 1964, and the station finally closed on 8 March 1965. The remains of the platforms are now overgrown with vegetation, and the station has been converted to a dwelling. The site is open as part of the railway path between Robin Hood's Bay and Ravenscar.

References

Sources

External links

 Fyling Hall station on navigable O. S. map

Disused railway stations in the Borough of Scarborough
Former North Eastern Railway (UK) stations
Beeching closures in England
Railway stations in Great Britain opened in 1885
Railway stations in Great Britain closed in 1915
Railway stations in Great Britain opened in 1920
Railway stations in Great Britain closed in 1965